Lallie Charles (née Charlotte Elizabeth Martin) (1869–1919), was an Irish photographer. Along with her sister Rita Martin, she was one of the most commercially successful women portraitists of the early 20th century.

Lallie Charles was born in Ireland. In about 1895 she married London photographer Georges Garet-Charles, whom she divorced around 1902. She was  a society photographer. In 1896 she opened her first studio, called "The Nook", at 1 Titchfield Road, Regent's Park, London. In 1897 Rita Martin, her sister, went to work with her. In 1906 Martin opened her own studio at 27 Baker Street and the two sisters became competitors. The following year she moved to a new address, 39A Curzon Street, where she became the "foremost female portrait photographer of her day". 

Charles was inspired by Alice Hughes. Other pioneer women photographers of her time, other than her sister, were: Christina Broom, Kate Pragnell and Lizzie Caswall Smith. Mme Yevonde was an apprentice of Charles, and Cecil Beaton, as a young man, posed for a family portrait, an experience he later described in his book Photobiography. Talking about the sisters, Beaton said: "Rita Martin and her sister, Lallie Charles, the rival photographer, posed their sitters in a soft conservatory-looking light, making all hair deliriously fashionable to be photo-lowered".  Charles later married again, to Herbert Carr. She died in Mayfair, London, on 5 April 1919.

A small selection of negatives by Lallie Charles and Rita Martin are preserved at the National Portrait Gallery, donated by their niece Lallie Charles Cowell in 1994.

Gallery

References
    

1869 births
1919 deaths
English women photographers
19th-century British photographers
19th-century British women artists
20th-century British photographers
Irish photographers
Irish women photographers
19th-century women photographers
20th-century women photographers
19th-century English women
19th-century English people
20th-century English women
20th-century English people